A list of events in 1325 in Italy:

 Battle of Altopascio
The Battle of Altopascio was a battle fought in 1325 in Tuscany, between the Ghibelline forces of Castruccio Castracani and the Guelph ones of the Republic of Florence.

Births
Pandolfo II Malatesta, condottiere

References

Italy
Italy
Years of the 14th century in Italy